Charles Villiers may refer to:

 Charles Pelham Villiers (1802–1898), British lawyer and politician
 Charles Villiers (actor), Australian actor and director
 Charles Hyde Villiers (1912–1992), British businessman and chairman of British Steel
 Charles de Villiers (born 1953), South African chess player

See also
 Villiers (disambiguation)